The Old Piano Roll Blues may refer to:
 a 1950 novelty hit song by Cy Coben
 Piano roll blues, a figure of speech originally referring to the Coben song, designating a legal argument concerning U.S. patent law relating to computer software